In mathematics, variation of parameters, also known as variation of constants, is a general method to solve inhomogeneous linear ordinary differential equations.

For first-order inhomogeneous linear differential equations it is usually possible to find solutions via integrating factors or undetermined coefficients with considerably less effort, although those methods leverage heuristics that involve guessing and do not work for all inhomogeneous linear differential equations.

Variation of parameters extends to linear partial differential equations as well, specifically to inhomogeneous problems for linear evolution equations like the heat equation, wave equation, and vibrating plate equation.  In this setting, the method is more often known as Duhamel's principle, named after Jean-Marie Duhamel (1797–1872) who first applied the method to solve the inhomogeneous heat equation.  Sometimes variation of parameters itself is called Duhamel's principle and vice versa.

History 

The method of variation of parameters was first sketched by the Swiss mathematician Leonhard Euler (1707–1783), and later completed by the Italian-French mathematician Joseph-Louis Lagrange (1736–1813).

A forerunner of the method of variation of a celestial body's orbital elements appeared in Euler's work in 1748, while he was studying the mutual perturbations of Jupiter and Saturn.  In his 1749 study of the motions of the earth, Euler obtained differential equations for the orbital elements. In 1753, he applied the method to his study of the motions of the moon.

Lagrange first used the method in 1766.  Between 1778 and 1783, he further developed the method in two series of memoirs: one on variations in the motions of the planets and another on determining the orbit of a comet from three observations. During 1808–1810, Lagrange gave the method of variation of parameters its final form in a third series of papers.

Description of method 

Given an ordinary non-homogeneous linear differential equation of order n

Let  be a basis of the vector space of solutions of the corresponding homogeneous equation

Then a particular solution to the non-homogeneous equation is given by

One last differentiation gives

By substituting into and applying and  it follows that

The linear system ( and ) of n equations can then be solved using Cramer's rule yielding

The particular solution to the non-homogeneous equation can then be written as

Intuitive explanation 

Consider the equation of the forced dispersionless spring, in suitable units:

When the external force is zero, this is the homogeneous equation (whose solutions are linear combinations of sines and cosines, corresponding to the spring oscillating with constant total energy).

We can construct the solution physically, as follows.

The homogeneous initial-value problem, representing a small impulse  being added to the solution at time , is

The unique solution to this problem is easily seen to be .  The linear superposition of all of these solutions is given by the integral:

To verify that this satisfies the required equation:

as required (see: Leibniz integral rule).

The general method of variation of parameters allows for solving an inhomogeneous linear equation

by means of considering the second-order linear differential operator L to be the net force, thus the total impulse imparted to a solution between time s and s+ds is F(s)ds.  Denote by  the solution of the homogeneous initial value problem 

Then a particular solution of the inhomogeneous equation is 

the result of linearly superposing the infinitesimal homogeneous solutions.  There are generalizations to higher order linear differential operators.

In practice, variation of parameters usually involves the fundamental solution of the homogeneous problem, the infinitesimal solutions  then being given in terms of explicit linear combinations of linearly independent fundamental solutions.  In the case of the forced dispersionless spring, the kernel  is the associated decomposition into fundamental solutions.

Examples

First-order equation 

The complementary solution to our original (inhomogeneous) equation is the general solution of the corresponding homogeneous equation (written below):

This homogeneous differential equation can be solved by different methods, for example separation of variables:

The complementary solution to our original equation is therefore:

Now we return to solving the non-homogeneous equation:
 
Using the method variation of parameters, the particular solution is formed by multiplying the complementary solution by an unknown function C(x):

By substituting the particular solution into the non-homogeneous equation, we can find C(x):
 

 

 

 
We only need a single particular solution, so we arbitrarily select  for simplicity. Therefore the particular solution is:

The final solution of the differential equation is:

This recreates the method of integrating factors.

Specific second-order equation 
Let us solve

We want to find the general solution to the differential equation, that is, we want to find solutions to the homogeneous differential equation
 
The characteristic equation is:
 

The Wronskian of these two functions is

 

Because the Wronskian is non-zero, the two functions are linearly independent, so this is in fact the general solution for the homogeneous differential equation (and not a mere subset of it).

We seek functions A(x) and B(x) so A(x)u1 + B(x)u2 is a particular solution of the non-homogeneous equation. We need only calculate the integrals

Recall that for this example

That is,

General second-order equation 
We have a differential equation of the form

and we define the linear operator

where D represents the differential operator.

We must solve first the corresponding homogeneous equation:

by the technique of our choice. Once we've obtained two linearly independent solutions to this homogeneous differential equation (because this ODE is second-order) — call them u1 and u2 — we can proceed with variation of parameters.

Now, we seek the general solution to the differential equation  which we assume to be of the form

Since the above is only one equation and we have two unknown functions, it is reasonable to impose a second condition. We choose the following:

Now,

Differentiating again (omitting intermediary steps)

Now we can write the action of L upon uG as

Since u1 and u2 are solutions, then

We have the system of equations

Expanding,

So the above system determines precisely the conditions

We seek A(x) and B(x) from these conditions, so, given

we can solve for (A′(x), B′(x))T, so

where W denotes the Wronskian of u1 and u2. (We know that W is nonzero, from the assumption that u1 and u2 are linearly independent.) So,

While homogeneous equations are relatively easy to solve, this method allows the calculation of the coefficients of the general solution of the inhomogeneous equation, and thus the complete general solution of the inhomogeneous equation can be determined.

Notes

References

See also
 Reduction of order
 Alekseev–Gröbner formula, a generalization of the variation of constants formula.

External links 
Online Notes / Proof by Paul Dawkins, Lamar University.
PlanetMath page.
A NOTE ON LAGRANGE’S METHOD OF VARIATION OF PARAMETERS

Ordinary differential equations